The 2013 Milano–Torino was the 94th edition of the Milano–Torino single-day cycling race. It was held on 2 October 2013, over a distance of 193 km, starting near Milan in Settimo Milanese and ending near Turin on the Colle di Superga ("Superga Hill").

Diego Ulissi of Lampre-Merida, who was second in the 2012 edition, won the race, Team Saxo-Tinkoff's Rafał Majka was second and Daniel Moreno (Team Katusha) completed the podium. The Italian rider attacked on the final climb together with Alberto Contador (2012 winner), Alejandro Valverde, Rafał Majka, Domenico Pozzovivo and Daniel Moreno, waiting the last 250 m to sprint to victory.

Teams
A total of 21 teams and more than 150 riders were invited to the race. Among the riders, there favourites were Alberto Contador, Alejandro Valverde, Joaquim Rodríguez, Jan Bakelants, Carlos Betancur and Diego Ulissi

Results

References

2013 UCI Europe Tour
2013 in Italian sport
Milano–Torino